Banyunibo is a 9th-century Buddhist temple located in Cepit hamlet, Bokoharjo village, Prambanan, Sleman Regency, Special Region of Yogyakarta, Indonesia. Further north is the Prambanan temple, and to the south are the Gunung Sewu hills, extension of Gunung Kidul hills.

Architecture 
Banyunibo has a curved rooftop design crowned with a solitary stupa; this theme is unique among the surviving Buddhist temples of Central Java. The curved rooftop was either meant to symbolize lotus or padma petals, or meant to mimic the organic roof made from ijuk fibres (black fibres surrounding the trunk of Arenga pinnata) common in ancient Java vernacular architecture and also found today in Balinese temple roof architecture. The main structure was originally surrounded by stupas at ground level, the foundations of which can still be seen today. The stupas' foundations are arranged in a row of three stupas on the south side of the temple, and three stupas on the east side. The northern side probably also contains the base of three stupas, however, it still buried under a meter thick of earth. The main temple is facing west.

The stairs and the portal of the temple are adorned with typical Kala-Makara style, typical of ancient Central Javanese temples dated from this period. Makara is located on each side of the stair and Kala head is located on top of the portals. The niches surrounding the body of the temple are adorned with the images of Bodhisattvas, while the niches upon the windows are adorned with the images of taras with each hands holding flowers. The inner wall is adorned with the image of Hariti surrounded by children (some parts of this relief are missing) and Vaisravana. The inner wall also adorned with a bald male figure underneath an umbrella being upheld by servants, suggests that it may represent one of the temple's patrons.

The collapsed ruins of Banyunibo were discovered in November 1940. Research continued to 1942 and succeeded to reconstruct the roof and the portal section of the temple. The reconstruction was halted due to World War II and Indonesian National Revolution. In 1962 the restoration of the sub-basement, foot, and wall section of the temple, as well as the north wall, was finished. The reconstruction of the Banyunibo temple was completed in 1978.

Gallery

Location 
wikimapia

See also 
 Borobudur
 Buddhism in Indonesia
 Candi of Indonesia
 Candi Mendut
 Candi Pawon
 Indonesian Esoteric Buddhism
 Prambanan Plain

References

External links 
 The images of Banyunibo

Buddhist temples in Indonesia
Archaeological sites in Indonesia
Mataram Kingdom
Cultural Properties of Indonesia in Yogyakarta
9th-century Buddhist temples